Madison is a city in Madison County, Mississippi, United States. The population was 27,747 at the 2020 census. It is part of the Jackson Metropolitan Statistical Area.

History
The city of Madison, named for James Madison, the fourth President of the United States, developed along a bustling railroad track in antebellum Mississippi. It began in 1856 when the Illinois Central Railroad opened Madison Station, the forerunner of the city of Madison.

The nearby town of Madisonville was a settlement along the stagecoach route on the Natchez Trace. It was the first county seat of Madison County in 1828, and had a race track, two banks, a wagon factory, and at least one hotel. Its residents gradually moved to the new railroad community, and old Madisonville became defunct.

Like many railroad towns in the South, Madison Station was heavily damaged by the Union Army during the Civil War. Ten miles from the state capital of Jackson, Madison Station was largely destroyed in 1863 after the July 18–22 siege of Jackson. No battles were fought in Madison County, but Major General Stephen D. Lee concentrated his command in Madison Station during the month of February 1864. Stephen Lee was later appointed as the first president of Mississippi State College (now Mississippi State University).

The railroad continued to attract growth after the Civil War. In 1897, the Madison Land Company encouraged northerners to "Go South, and grow up with the country." Located in Chicago, the land company's interest in development prompted Madison to incorporate as a village, though the charter was lost when regular elections were not held because of the failure of the "land boom".

The Madison Land Company offered prime land for as little as $3.00 an acre. It claimed that Mississippi had the lowest debt ratio in the United States at $19.00 per capita and that Mississippians were one-third healthier by "official figures" than people in New York and Massachusetts. The figures were quoted in the Madison Land Company's brochure by Bishop Hugh Miller Thompson, the second Episcopal Bishop of the Diocese of Mississippi and a Madison resident, who originally came from Wisconsin.

After many years of court battles, the city annexed other territory to expand its limits in size in the late 2000s.

Geography

Demographics

2020 census

As of the 2020 United States Census, there were 27,747 people, 8,972 households, and 7,121 families residing in the city.

2000 census
As of the census of 2000, there were 14,692 people, 5,189 households, and 4,249 families residing in the city. The population density was 1,090.0 people per square mile (420.8/km). There were 5,316 housing units at an average density of 394.4 per square mile (152.3/km). The racial makeup of the city was 93.23% White, 4.89% African American, 0.07% Native American, 1.20% Asian, 0.03% Pacific Islander, 0.18% from other races, and 0.40% from two or more races. Hispanic or Latino of any race were 0.69% of the population.

There were 5,189 households, out of which 48.5% had children under the age of 18 living with them, 73.0% were married couples living together, 7.4% had a female householder with no husband present, and 18.1% were non-families. 16.3% of all households were made up of individuals, and 5.0% had someone living alone who was 65 years of age or older. The average household size was 2.81 and the average family size was 3.17.

In the city, the population was spread out, with 31.2% under the age of 18, 4.1% from 18 to 24, 35.1% from 25 to 44, 21.1% from 45 to 64, and 8.5% who were 65 years of age or older. The median age was 36 years. For every 100 females, there were 93.3 males. For every 100 females age 18 and over, there were 88.9 males.

The median income for a household in the city was $71,266 (estimated at $105,485 in 2008), and the median income for a family was $77,202. Males had a median income of $54,358 versus $34,081 for females. The per capita income for the city was $29,082. About 2.1% of families and 2.5% of the population were below the poverty line, including 3.5% of those under age 18 and 1.4% of those age 65 or over.

Recreation
 Strawberry Patch Park, one mile running trail, playground, and children's fishing pond
 Liberty Park, sports fields and playgrounds
 Simmons Arboretum, wooded trail

Education
The City of Madison is served by the Madison County School District. The Student/TeacherRatio is 19:1.

Madison-Ridgeland Academy is a 6A private high school and member of the MSAIS located in Madison.

St. Joseph Catholic School is a parochial school located in Madison that serves the Jackson Area; it is of the Roman Catholic Diocese of Jackson.

In 2010, Tulane University opened a satellite campus of its School of Continuing Studies. The campus was housed in a renovated wing of the former Madison Station Elementary School (Madison Ridgeland High School) campus until it closed in 2017.Jackson State University has also opened a satellite campus in the city.

Transportation
There is one small airport in the city, Bruce Campbell Field.

Points of interest
 Simmons Arboretum
 Swedish-American Chamber of Commerce South Central U.S. (est. 1997)
 Chapel of the Cross in nearby Mannsdale is listed on the National Register of Historic Places

Notable people
 Eddie Briggs, lawyer and former Lieutenant Governor of Mississippi.
Shaq Buchanan (born 1997), basketball player in the Israeli Basketball Premier League
 Tate Ellington, actor.
 Stephen Gostkowski, professional football player for the Tennessee Titans.
 John Henry Rogers, United States Congressman from Arkansas and a federal judge.
 Ruston Webster, NFL scout for the Atlanta Falcons.
 Corey Dickerson, professional baseball player for the Miami Marlins. He resides here during the offseason.

References

External links
City of Madison
Madison Chamber of Commerce
County Website

Cities in Mississippi
Cities in Madison County, Mississippi
Cities in Jackson metropolitan area, Mississippi
Populated places established in 1856
1856 establishments in Mississippi